Gerring is a surname. Notable people with the surname include:

Cathy Gerring (born 1961), American golfer
Gunnar Gerring (1916–2009), Swedish diplomat
Liz Gerring, American choreographer

See also
Gerling (surname)
Herring (surname)
Perring